Odrisamer Despaigne Orue (born April 4, 1987) is a Cuban professional baseball pitcher for the Mariachis de Guadalajara of the Mexican League. He has played in Major League Baseball (MLB) for the San Diego Padres, Baltimore Orioles, Miami Marlins, Los Angeles Angels, and Chicago White Sox.

Career

Cuban career
Despaigne played for the Industriales of the Cuban National Series, making his debut in the league in 2007. He played for the Cuban national baseball team, and defected from Cuba while in Europe for the 2013 World Port Tournament. Despaigne became a legal resident of Spain, and traveled to Mexico.

San Diego Padres

Despaigne and fellow Cuban defector Aledmys Díaz held a showcase for Major League Baseball teams on February 13, 2014. Despaigne signed a minor league deal with the San Diego Padres on May 2, 2014. The Padres assigned Despaigne to the San Antonio Missions of the Double-A Texas League, where in two games started, he allowed one earned run in  innings pitched. The Padres promoted Despaigne to the El Paso Chihuahuas of the Triple-A Pacific Coast League on May 26. Despaigne was called up by the Padres on June 23 to start that night against the San Francisco Giants. 
Despaigne pitched seven shutout innings, allowing four hits in his major league debut. In his fifth major league start on July 20, Despaigne pitched 7 2/3 no-hit innings before the New York Mets' Daniel Murphy doubled. The Padres won the game 2–1.

Baltimore Orioles
On February 4, 2016, Despaigne was traded to the Baltimore Orioles for minor league pitcher Jean Cosme. The Orioles designated Despaigne for assignment on September 5, 2016.

Miami Marlins
The Miami Marlins claimed Despaigne off waivers on September 15, 2016. He started a game for Miami against the New York Mets on May 6, 2017, allowing eight runs (three earned) in an 11–3 loss, and on May 17 returned as a relief pitcher, giving up two runs and four walks in one inning pitched. He was sent back to the Triple-A New Orleans Baby Cakes and was recalled on July 28, 2017.

Los Angeles Angels
On August 14, 2018, the Marlins traded Despaigne to the Los Angeles Angels for cash considerations. He made his first start with the Angels on August 17 against the Texas Rangers. He elected free agency on November 5, 2018.

Cincinnati Reds
On January 7, 2019, Despaigne signed a minor league deal with the Cincinnati Reds. He opted out of his contract on May 16.

Chicago White Sox
On May 19, 2019, Despaigne signed a minor league deal with the Chicago White Sox. He made his first start with the team on June 10 against the Washington Nationals. He finished 0–2 in 3 starts for the team. He elected free agency following the 2019 season.

KT Wiz
On November 10, 2019, Despaigne signed a one-year, $900,000 deal with the KT Wiz of the KBO League. On December 16, 2020, Despaigne re-signed with the Wiz for the 2021 season on a one-year, $800K contract. He posted a 13–10 record with a team-leading 3.39 ERA and 165 strikeouts over 33 starts. On December 30, 2021, Despaigne re-signed with the Wiz for the 2022 season on a one-year contract worth up to $1.35 million. He became a free agent after the 2022 season.

Mariachis de Guadalajara
On February 24, 2023, Despaigne signed with the Mariachis de Guadalajara of the Mexican League for the 2023 season.

See also
List of baseball players who defected from Cuba

References

External links

1987 births
Living people
Baseball players from Havana
Major League Baseball pitchers
Major League Baseball players from Cuba
Cuban expatriate baseball players in the United States
2013 World Baseball Classic players
Defecting Cuban baseball players
San Diego Padres players
Baltimore Orioles players
Miami Marlins players
Los Angeles Angels players
Chicago White Sox players
Louisville Bats players
Industriales de La Habana players
Águilas de Mexicali players
Cuban expatriate baseball players in Mexico
San Antonio Missions players
El Paso Chihuahuas players
Norfolk Tides players
New Orleans Baby Cakes players
Estrellas Orientales players
Cuban expatriate baseball players in the Dominican Republic
Charlotte Knights players
KT Wiz players
Cuban expatriate baseball players in South Korea